Inna Gudavadze (ინა გუდავაძე) is a Georgian businesswoman and philanthropist and the widow of Badri Patarkatsishvili. In 2017 the Sunday Times estimated her wealth at £650m making her the 196th wealthiest person in the UK. She is the founder and President of the Gudavadze-Patarkatsishvili Foundation, that supports education initiatives in Georgia.

She has two daughters, Liana Zhmotova and Iya Patarkatsishvili. The death of her husband sparked one of the biggest estate battles ever that forced Inna and her family to fight for their interests in the courts against several of Badri's former business associates. Inna now has extensive business and property interests in Georgia and across the rest of the world.

Born in Tbilisi, Georgia, Inna graduated with honours from the Georgian State Institute of Foreign Languages. She married Badri Patarkatsishvili in 1979 with whom she raised two daughters, Liana (1980) and Iya (1983). For 19 years she worked as a translator at the Tbilisi Scientific Research Institute of Electron-Ion Technology. The family moved to Moscow in 1993 and returned to Georgia in 2000. Inna helped her husband during his life with numerous charitable and civic projects both in Russia and in Georgia. Many of these related to landscape design which continues to be a hobby.

Business interests
Imedi – The first and largest independent television station in Georgia, launched by Badri Patarkatsishvili in 2003. The business is currently run by Inna’s eldest daughter, Liana Zhmotova.

The Fisher Island Holdings – Owner of the Palazzo del Sol and Palazzo del Luna condominium developments on Fisher Island, Miami, one of the most prestigious post codes in the US. In May 2016, a penthouse apartment in Palazzo del Sol was sold for $21.5m or more than $3,200 per square foot, setting a new record for a Fisher Island condo.

IDS Borjomi – one of the best known brands in Georgia and Russia and other FSU countries,  Borjomi water, from the resort town on Borjomi in central Georgia, is popular across the former Soviet Union.  In January 2013 Inna sold a controlling stake in the company to Alfa Group, although she has retained a substantial interest.

Rustavi Metallurgical Plant – the largest metallurgical plant in the Caucasus and one of Georgia’s largest industrial enterprises.

Benahavis Hills Country Club – exclusive development of luxury villas near the Andalucian village of Benahavis.

MagtiCom - a 46% stake in Georgia’s second largest mobile operator.

Mtatsminda Park – the famous park in Tbilisi, a place of interest on top of the hill overlooking the city

In February 2015 Inna and her family sold their interests in Danube Foods Group (DFG), the Serbian food conglomerate, to Mid Europa Partners in a deal that valued the assets at €630m. The group included Imlek, the largest dairy company in the Balkans, confectionary maker Bambi Banat and Serbian mineral water and non-alcoholic beverage company Knjaz Milos.

Philanthropy 
In 2018, Inna launched The Gudavadze-Patarkatsishvili Foundation (გუდავაძე-პატარკაციშვილის ფონდი) (GPF) in her late husband’s memory. 
The organisation is focused on promoting education initiatives in Georgia. The foundation is the main sponsor of the Georgian National Teacher Prize, the Annual TVET Award for professional education and supports a scholarship program with the San Diego State University Georgia, among other initiatives in the Georgian education sphere.

Estate battle 
Inna's husband, Badri Patarkatsishvili, died intestate in February 2008. Inna and her family, the rightful heirs to his residual estate, were forced to defend their interests from some of her late husband's closest business associates. Having been left with close to nothing, they successfully pursued their interests through the courts in the UK, US, Georgia, Gibraltar and Liechtenstein.

Joseph Kay & the forged testimony documents
Immediately after Badri died, Joseph Kay, a distant relative of Badri who had assisted with his business affairs, along with Emmanuel Zeltser, an American lawyer, unlawfully attempted to take control of numerous assets that had belonged to Badri including the Georgian TV station, Imedi, Mtatsminda Park, the Rustavi Metallurgical Plant in Georgia and a large development on Fisher Island in Florida.

Kay and Zeltser claimed to be in possession of Badri's last will and testament that appointed Kay as executor of the estate. These documents were later declared to be forgeries in the UK High Court.

An attempt by trustees of the family estate to establish Kay's legal position led to a comprehensive dismissal of Kay's case by Mr Justice Dudley in the Supreme Court of Gibraltar in February 2010. Mr Justice Dudley described Kay's case as "wholly unconvincing", adding that we was a "mendacious individual" and "certainly not a witness of truth."

After further battles in the US, UK and Georgia, the assets were eventually returned to Inna and her family.

Arbitration in Georgia
Following Badri's death, the Georgian TV station, Imedi, that had been set up by Badri to combat government media censorship and had been fiercely critical of the President Mikhail Saakashvili, fell in the hands of Joseph Kay, and, according to Inna, became a mouthpiece for the government. The watchdog, Reporters Without Borders, described the move as ""a real setback for freedom of expression."

Enlisting the support of the former UK Attorney General, Lord Goldsmith, in December 2008 Inna began international arbitration proceedings against the Government of Georgia, claiming that the TV station, as well as other Georgian assets that had belonged to Badri, had been unfairly expropriated from them with the assistance of the government. On the 29 October 2008, Inna Gudavadze told a press conference in Tbilisi that Imedi and Mtatsminda Park were “Badri’s personal projects for Georgia and the Georgian people and as his wife I have a duty to see that these works are carried on."

In July 2011, the Patarkatsishvili family reached a settlement with the government that saw Mtatsminda Park returned to Inna and the family in return for them renouncing all claims to the ownership of Imedi TV. Following the fall of President Mikhail Saakashvili, Imedi was also subsequently returned to Inna and her family in October 2012 under the new government. 
 
In July 2014, the Chief Prosecutor’s Office of Georgia issued a criminal indictment to former President Mikhail Saakashvili and a group of state officials for their role in the illegal expropriation of the Georgian assets owned by the Patarkasishvili family.

Settlement with Boris Berezovsky
In the autumn of 2012 Inna reached a confidential settlement with Badri's former business partner, Boris Berezovsky. Berezovsky and Badri had jointly owned a number of assets but in 2006 announced an "economic divorce" which had not completed by the time Badri died. Following Badri's death Berezovsky had launched a claim against Inna for ownership of half of Badri's estate. The case was later settled out of court.

Metaloinvest
In 2013 Inna Gudavadze, her two daughters Iya Patarkatsishvili and Liana Zhmotova, and Badri's mother Natela Patarkatsishvili brought a $1.8bn action against another of Badri's business associates, Vasily Anisimov. The family claimed that they had a part-entitlement to the 20% share formerly held by Mr Anisimov in mining company Metalloinvest. The case was settled in March 2014 before it came to court.

On conclusion of the case, a family spokesman told the Financial Times “I am very pleased to confirm that a settlement has been reached between my clients and Mr Anisimov which conclusively brings to an end the long-running dispute."

References

Businesspeople from Georgia (country)
Living people
Year of birth missing (living people)